, formerly known as Batara Kesuma, is the co-founder and Chief Technology Officer (as of 2007) of mixi, a Japanese social networking site. He is currently co-founder and managing partner of East Ventures, a venture capital firm focusing on Japan and Southeast Asia.

He proposed mixi in December 2003, and was responsible for creating the corporation.

He was born on July 27th, 1979 in Medan, Indonesia. He graduated from the Engineering division of Takushoku University.

Batara changed his citizenship to Japanese in March 2007, hence changing his last name to Eto, which is passed down from his grandfather who was originally from Japan.

References

Living people
1979 births
Indonesian people of Japanese descent
Indonesian emigrants to Japan
Naturalized citizens of Japan
Indonesian company founders
Japanese company founders
Japanese people of Indonesian descent
Chief technology officers
21st-century Indonesian businesspeople
21st-century Japanese businesspeople